Lessertinella is a genus of  dwarf spiders that was first described by J. Denis in 1947.  it contains only two species, both found in Austria, France, Germany, Italy, Macedonia, Romania, Slovakia, and Switzerland: L. carpatica and L. kulczynskii.

See also
 List of Linyphiidae species (I–P)

References

Araneomorphae genera
Linyphiidae